Real estate in China is developed and managed by public, private, and state-owned red chip enterprises.

In the years leading up to the 2008 financial crisis, the real estate sector in China was growing so rapidly that the government implemented a series of policies—including raising the required down payment for some property purchases, and five 2007 interest rate increases—due to concerns of overheating. But after the crisis hit, these policies were quickly eliminated, and in some cases tightened. Beijing also launched a massive stimulus package to boost growth, and much of the stimulus eventually flowed into the property market and drove prices up, resulting in investors increasingly looking abroad. By late 2014, the IMF warned that a real estate oversupply problem had arisen that threatened to cause detrimental effects to the Chinese economy, particularly in 2nd and 3rd tier cities. As of 2015, the market was experiencing low growth and the central government had eased prior measures to tighten interest rates, increase deposits and impose restrictions. By early 2016, the Chinese government introduced a series of measures to increase property purchases, including lower taxes on home sales, limiting land sales for new development projects, and the third in a series of mortgage down payment reductions.

History

As of 2010, China's real estate market is the largest in the world, comprising about 20% of the economy of China.

Property bubble, 2005–2011

The Chinese property bubble was a real estate bubble in residential and/or commercial real estate in China. The phenomenon has seen average housing prices in the country triple from 2005 to 2009, possibly driven by both government policies and Chinese cultural attitudes.
Tianjin High price-to-income and price-to-rent ratios for property and the high number of unoccupied residential and commercial units have been held up as evidence of a bubble. Critics of the bubble theory point to China's relatively conservative mortgage lending standards and trends of increasing urbanization and rising incomes as proof that property prices can remain supported.

The growth of the housing bubble ended in late 2011 when housing prices began to fall, following policies responding to complaints that members of the middle-class were unable to afford homes in large cities. The deflation of the property bubble is seen as one of the primary causes for China's declining economic growth in 2012.

2011 estimates by property analysts state that there are some 64 million empty properties and apartments in China and that housing development in China is massively oversupplied and overvalued, and is a bubble waiting to burst with serious consequences in the future. The BBC cites Ordos in Inner Mongolia as the largest ghost town in China, full of empty shopping malls and apartment complexes. A large, and largely uninhabited, urban real estate development has been constructed 25 km from Dongsheng District in the Kangbashi New Area. Intended to house a million people, it remains largely uninhabited. Intended to have 300,000 residents by 2010, government figures stated it had 28,000.
In Beijing residential rent prices rose 32% between 2001 and 2003; the overall inflation rate in China was 16% over the same period (Huang, 2003). To avoid sinking into the economic downturn, in 2008, the Chinese government immediately altered China's monetary policy from a conservative stance to a progressive attitude by means of suddenly increasing the money supply and largely relaxing credit conditions. Under such circumstances, the main concern is whether this expansionary monetary policy has acted to simulate the property bubble (Chiang, 2016).
Land supply has a significant impact on house price fluctuations while demand factors such as user costs, income and residential mortgage loan have greater influences.

International investment
Chinese consumers have become one of the biggest groups of investors in cross-border property. In the US, Chinese buyers invested $28.6 billion into the residential real estate in 2015, more than any other country. In Australia, Chinese buyers were approved for AU$32 billion of commercial and residential real estate investment in 2015–16, the most of any country. Other estimates put Chinese international real estate investment at $33 billion in commercial and residential property in 2016, up 53% from 2015. Sue Jong, Chief Operating Officer of Juwai.com, a subsidiary of Juwai IQI said most Chinese buyers are "the average Chinese mom and pop looking to invest overseas. The large portion is the middle to upper middle class, that's interested in a good stable investment and may be thinking about emigrating or sending their kids to school there."

Welfare housing system, parallel dynamics, and allegations of corruption
As of 2010, China has officially ordered an end to its welfare housing system; however, according to China Youth Daily, a parallel housing market continues to exist. Government agencies continue to pay less than 20% of market value for real estate, and many officials purportedly misappropriate renovation and housing reform funds for personal gain.

Companies

See also
Housing in China
Nail house
Under-occupied developments in China
2020–2022 Chinese property sector crisis

References

Further reading
 Chiang, S. (2016). Rising residential rents in Chinese mega cities: The role of monetary policy. Urban Studies, 53(16), 3493–3496. doi:10.1177/0042098015613753 
 Huang, Y.  (2003). Renters' housing behaviors in transitional urban China, Housing Studies, 18(1), 103–126. doi: 10.1080/0267303032000076867
"Understanding Residential Real Estate in China" IMF working paper April 28, 2015
Direct link to PDF file "Understanding Residential Real Estate in China" IMF working paper April 28, 2015

 
Housing in China